Hots may refer to having "the hots for a person", or physical attraction. HOTS or H.O.T.S. may also refer to:

Film, literature, music 
 H.O.T.S., a 1979 sex comedy film
The House of the Spirits, a 1982 novel
The House of the Spirits (film), a 1993 film adaptation of the novel
Hope of the States, an English indie rock group
Heart of the Sunrise, a song by English progressive rock band Yes

Games 
StarCraft II: Heart of the Swarm, a 2013 video game
Heroes of the Storm, a 2015 multiplayer video game
Age of the Tempest, a 2013 role-playing game formerly known as Heroes of the Storm

See also
 Hot (disambiguation)
 HOTAS, an acronym for 'hands on throttle and stick'
 Higher-order thinking, also called higher order thinking skills